The National Technical Honor Society (NTHS) is an honor society for outstanding career and technical students of workforce vocational education institutions in the United States.

Overview
NTHS began in 1984 as the National Vocational-Technical Honor Society at H.B. Swofford Career Center, Spartanburg County, South Carolina.  In 2003, the board of directors unanimously agreed to change the name of the organization from the National Vocational-Technical Honor Society to the National Technical Honor Society.

Today NTHS serves over 4,500 member schools, both secondary and post-secondary, and has a footprint in all 50 states, with chapters expanding into the Bahamas, American Samoa, Puerto Rico, and Guam. NTHS honors the achievements of leading career and technical education students, provides scholarships, and cultivates excellence in today's highly competitive, skilled workforce. Its fiscal year runs with the general school calendar, August 1 – July 31. The Jon H. Poteat Scholarship is the largest scholarship fund for NTHS. In April 2018, over $225,000 was awarded through the Jon H. Poteat Scholarship Fund, each equaling $1,000.

NTHS also works with seven Career Technical Student Organizations (CTSOs):HOSA, SkillsUSA, DECA, FBLA/PBL, BPA, FCCLA.

The goals of the National Technical Honor Society include:
 Rewarding excellence in workforce education
 Developing self-esteem, pride
 Encouraging students to reach higher levels of achievement
 Promoting strong values-honesty, responsibility, initiative, teamwork, leadership, citizenship, scholarship
 Helping schools build effective business partnerships
 Building a strong positive image for workforce education in America

References

External links 
 National Technical Honor Society

State associations 
 Oklahoma National Technical Honor Society

Honor societies
Student organizations established in 1984
1984 establishments in South Carolina